is a railway station on the Yokosuka Line in Shinagawa, Tokyo, Japan, operated by East Japan Railway Company (JR East).

Station layout

This station has two elevated side platforms and two tracks, and is located below the tracks of the Tōkaidō Shinkansen.

There is a fork connecting to the Yamanote Line on the south side of the station.

The line coming from Yokohama splits at this station to the Yokosuka Line toward Shinagawa station and the Shōnan-Shinjuku Line toward Ōsaki Station.

Platforms

History 
The station opened on April 2, 1986. With the privatization of Japanese National Railways (JNR) on April 1, 1987, the station came under the control of JR East.

Shonan-Shinjuku Line services began operating on December 1, 2001.

Surrounding area
 Grave of Hirobumi Ito
Yogyokuin Nyoraiji Temple
Core Stalle Nishi-Oi
J-Tower Nishiooi
Nishi-oi Hiroba Park
Nishioi Ryokuchi Park
Futaba Park
Shinagawa Shouei Junior and Senior High School
Ito Elementary School
Nikon Oi Factory
Nikon Systems
Nikon Staff Service

See also
 List of railway stations in Japan

External links

  

Stations of East Japan Railway Company
Railway stations in Tokyo
Railway stations in Japan opened in 1986
Shōnan-Shinjuku Line
Yokosuka Line